Hauz-i-Shamsi (literally "sunny watertank") also called Shamshi Talab is a water storage reservoir or tank built by Iltutmish of the Slave Dynasty in 1230 CE, at a location revealed to him in a dream by the Islamic prophet Muhammad. A palace called the Jahaz Mahal was built on the eastern edge of the same reservoir during the Lodi dynasty period in the 16th century as a retreat or Inn for use by pilgrims. Also at the edge of Hauz is the tomb of 17th-century Persian writer in the Mughal court, Abdul-Haqq Dehlavi. The monuments are situated in Mehrauli, Delhi.

Legend
A popular legend narrated is of Iltumish's dream in which Muhammad directed him to build a reservoir at a particular site. When Iltumish inspected the site the day after his dream, he reported to have found a hoof print of Muhammad's horse. He then erected a pavilion to mark the sacred location and excavated a large tank (reservoir) around the pavilion to harvest rain water. 

According to Sharma: "A red stone domed pavilion resting on twelve pillars located near the south-western corner of the tank, but originally believed to have been situated in its centre, is identified with the pavilion built by Iltumish. The original stone with hoof print is believed to have been removed, the present stone being a later renewal. The waters of the tank are regarded as sacred, and several graves of Muslim saints lie around it."

Reservoir

The domed pavilion (pictured) constructed by Iltumish to mark the foot print Muhammad's horse located in the middle of the tank is a double storeyed structure made of red sandstone supported on twelve pillars. It could be approached only by boat (now a foot bridge exists). The original stone, on which the foot print of the horse of Muhammad was imprinted, was located at this pavilion. It has since been removed but replaced by a new one. In view of its religious significance, the water stored in the tank was considered sacred. Many famous emperors and saints have been buried on the periphery of the reservoir. Because of reduction in the size of the reservoir over the years, due to encroachments and siltation, pavilion's present location is seen in the eastern edge of the tank.

Jharna

A Jharna or water fall emanating from the Hauz-i-Shamsi is located close to the Jahaz Mahal. It is identified as a significant water structure that had been developed by Nawab Ghaziuddin around 1700 AD as a pleasure garden during the Mughal rule. An underground pipe (still visible in ruins) supplied the runoff to the Jharna from Hauz-i–Shamshi. This was in addition to an open channel close by that carried the overflow of the tank to Tughlaqabad fort to enhance the drinking water supply. The Jharna structure was built in three parts (pictured – painting from Metcalfe's album). The first part consisted of the reservoir or the tank, the second part was the water fall and the last part consisted of the fountains. Akbar Shah II built the pavilion on the side and his son Bahadur Shah II added the central pavilion, more in the style of hayat hakhsh pool in the Red Fort. The Jharna, which was once the Mughal retreat and the highlight of the three-day festival of the Phool Walon Ki Sair, is seen now partly in ruins and the surroundings have been encroached upon (25 families are reported to be living here now). The water fall is seen more in the form of a drain in need of urgent restoration measures.

Restoration
Hauz-i-Shamsi and the Jharna, which are in state of deterioration, has drawn the attention of the Delhi High Court. The High Court commented severely on the inaction of the concerned authorities on their upkeep of the monuments and observed:Since 2000, we have been hearing this case and only files are getting thicker. The concerned authorities should now start taking action, seriously. 
A conservation architect has remarked:The Jharna is an extremely significant water structure and connected with protected monuments like Jahaz Mahal and Hauz-i-Shamsid. However, the multiplicity of ownership has led to neglect of the monument. The festival here is held by the MCD and the land otherwise belongs to the DDA. Ideally, the archaeological department or the ASI should take it over along with the MCD and the DDA ensuring that the environment around it is restored and the encroachments removed.

Hauz-i-Shamsi is also considered one of the heritage components of the historic and traditional water management systems of the city of Delhi and is mandated to be conserved under a ruling of the High Court.

Gallery

See also
 Chahartaq (architecture)
Jamali Kamali Mosque and Tomb, located in the Archaeological Village complex in Mehrauli, Delhi, India.

References

External links 

Monuments of National Importance in Delhi
Fountains in India
Mehrauli
New Delhi
History of Delhi
Tourist attractions in Delhi
Architecture of the Delhi Sultanate